This is a list of adverse effects of the anti-cancer drug pazopanib, sorted by frequency of occurrence.

Very common
Very common (>10% incidence) adverse effects include:

 Reduced appetite
 Headache
 Taste changes
 High blood pressure
 Diarrhoea
 Abdominal pain
 Nausea
 Vomiting
 Hair colour change
 Hand-foot syndrome
 Hair loss
 Rash
 Fatigue
 Increased alanine aminotransferase
 Increased aspartate aminotransferase
 Tumour pain‡
 Myelosuppression‡
 Stomatitis‡
 Exfoliative rash‡
 Skin hyperpigmentation‡
 Weight loss‡

Common
Common (1–10% incidence) adverse effects include:

 Tumour pain†
 Myelosuppression†
 Underactive thyroid
 Dehydration
 Low level of phosphate in the blood
 Dizziness
 Lethargy
 Paraesthesia
 Peripheral sensory neuropathy
 Blurred vision
 Hot flush
 Venous thromboembolic event
 Flushing
 Nose bleed
 Voice anomalies
 Shortness of breath
 Coughing up blood
 Stomatitis
 Indigestion
 Flatulence
 Abdominal distension
 Dry mouth
 Mouth ulceration
 Hyperbilirubinaemia
 Abnormal liver function
 Hepatotoxicity
 Skin hypopigmentation
 Dry skin
 Itchiness
 Erythema
 Skin depigmentation
 Hyperhidrosis
 Joint pain
 Muscle aches
 Muscle spasms
 Protein in the urine
 Mucosal inflammation
 Weakness
 Oedema
 Chest pain
 Weight loss†
 Increased blood creatinine
 Lipase increased
 Decreased white blood cell count
 Blood TSH decreased
 Amylase increased
 Gamma-glutamyltransferase increased
 Increased blood pressure
 Increased blood urea
 Abnormal liver function test
 Gingival infection‡
 Dizziness
 Insomnia
 Peripheral sensory neuropathy
 Heart dysfunction
 Blurred vision
 Low heart rate
 Left ventricular dysfunction
 Bleeding (including haemorrhage)
 High blood sugar
 Low blood sugar

Uncommon
Uncommon (0.1–1% incidence) adverse effects include:

 Torsades de pointes
 Heart failure
 Liver failure
 GI perforation (may be fatal)
 Fistula formation

Rare
Rare (<0.1% incidence) adverse effects include:
 Reversible posterior leucoencephalopathy syndrome

Notes
† Denotes side effects seen at the above frequency only in clinical trials performed in people with renal cell carcinoma.

‡ Denotes side effects seen at the above frequency only in clinical trials done in people with soft tissue sarcomas.

References

Pazopanib